Józef Gąsienica Daniel (15 June 1945 – 6 February 2008) was a Polish skier. He competed in the Nordic combined event at the 1968 Winter Olympics.

References

External links
 

1945 births
2008 deaths
Polish male Nordic combined skiers
Olympic Nordic combined skiers of Poland
Nordic combined skiers at the 1968 Winter Olympics
Sportspeople from Zakopane
20th-century Polish people